Michèle de Saint Laurent (December 9, 1926 – July 11, 2003) was a French carcinologist.

Biography
Michèle de Saint Laurent was born on December 9, 1926 at Fontainebleau, near Paris. Her father, an army officer, retired on grounds of ill health in 1938 and moved with his family to Plestin-les-Grèves in Brittany; he died in 1939. During the Second World War, Michèle's mother concealed British airmen from the Nazi regime, for which she was convicted in 1942 by a military tribunal and sent to Ravensbrück concentration camp, where she died in 1944.

Michèle married in 1950, taking the name Michèle Dechancé, and her daughter Odile was born later that year. She studied general biology at the University of Paris under Pierre-Paul Grassé, earning her  in 1954. She started undertaking scientific research even before finishing her degree, during a term spent at the  under Robert Deschiens, where she investigated the effect of iron salts on the molluscs that transmit schistosomiasis (also known as bilharzia or snail fever).

In 1965, Michèle divorced, and returned to using her maiden name. She retired on October 1, 1992, and split her time between her continued research activities and spending time at a house in Brittany. She had suffered for years from hepatitis C and contracted liver cancer in 2001; she died following a fall on July 11, 2003.

Work

The first major focus of Michèle de Saint Laurent's work was the systematics of hermit crabs. In the late 1960s, she revised the family Paguridae, erecting several new genera. She was also involved in describing the hermit crabs of the Calypso expedition from the Atlantic coast of South America, and was on board the Jean Charcot and the Thalassa during their scientific voyages.

She also investigated other decapod crustaceans, particularly the Thalassinidea. As a result of this work, she was invited in 1974 to visit the Smithsonian Institution to study the thalassinideans in their collections. During this work, she was given an unidentified specimen by Fenner A. Chace Jr. which had been caught by the Albatross expedition in 1908. She and Jacques Forest realised that it represented a living relative of the Glypheoidea, a group previously thought to have been extinct since the Eocene. They described the new genus together in 1975, as Neoglyphea.

De Saint Laurent's later work included a new classification of crabs (involving the recognition of a new section, Eubrachyura), and three new superfamilies (Axioidea, Enoplometopoidea and Retroplumoidea), as well as various works on the decapods of hydrothermal vents.

References

Citations

External links

1926 births
2003 deaths
20th-century French zoologists
French carcinologists
People from Fontainebleau
University of Paris alumni
National Museum of Natural History (France) people